Duarte/City of Hope station is an at-grade light rail station on the L Line of the Los Angeles Metro Rail system. It is located at the intersection of Duarte Road and Highland Avenue in Duarte, California, after which the station is named, along with the City of Hope National Medical Center located across the street from the station.

This station opened on March 5, 2016, as part of Phase 2A of the Foothill Extension project. This station and all the other original Gold Line and Foothill Extension stations will be part of the A Line upon completion of the Regional Connector project in 2023.

History 

The 1886 Duarte train station was the terminal station for the original trains for the Los Angeles and San Gabriel Valley Railroad. The Metro L Line uses the old right of way of the Los Angeles and San Gabriel Valley Railroad who built the first train tracks and 1886 station in Duarte. The Los Angeles and San Gabriel Valley Railroad was founded in 1883, by James F. Crank with the goal of bringing a rail line to San Gabriel Valley from downtown Los Angeles.  Los Angeles and San Gabriel Valley Railroad was sold on May 20, 1887 into the California Central Railway. The California Central Railway built a Duarte train depot in 1897. In 1889 the rail line and station was consolidated into Southern California Railway Company.  On January 17, 1906 Southern California Railway was sold to the Atchison, Topeka and Santa Fe Railway and called the Pasadena Subdivision. Amtrak-Santa Fe ran the Southwest Chief and Desert Wind over this line in Duarte, but relocated the Desert Wind to the Fullerton Line in 1986.  The Santa Fe line served the San Gabriel Valley until 1994, when the 1994 Northridge earthquake weakened the bridge in Arcadia and the track was closed until the L Line (formerly the Gold line) was built.

Service

Station layout

Hours and frequency

Connections 
, the following connections are available:
 Foothill Transit: ,  (DuarEbus Blue),  (DuarEbus Green)

References 

Duarte, California
L Line (Los Angeles Metro) stations
Railway stations in the United States opened in 2016
2016 establishments in California